Aclopinae is a subfamily of Scarabaeidae or scarab beetles in the superfamily Scarabaeoidea.

Distribution
The subfamily is found in northern Australia, Borneo and southern South America (Brazil and Argentina).

References

Scarabaeidae